Chieniodendron is a genus of plant  in the Annonaceae family. It has only one species Chieniodendron hainanense (synonyms Meiogyne hainanensis, Oncodostigma hainanense) native to mainland China (south Guangxi) and Hainan. It is threatened by habitat loss.

References

Annonaceae
Annonaceae genera
Monotypic magnoliid genera